The Horror Writers Association (HWA) periodically gives the Silver Hammer Award to an HWA volunteer who has done a truly massive amount of work for the organization, often unsung and behind the scenes. It was instituted in 1996, and is decided by a vote of HWA's Board of Trustees.

The award is so named because it represents the careful, steady, continuous work of building HWA's "house" — the many institutional systems that keep the organization functioning on a day-to-day basis. The award itself is a chrome-plated hammer with an engraved plaque on the handle. The chrome hammer is also a satisfying allusion to The Beatles' song, "Maxwell's Silver Hammer", a miniature horror story in itself.

The Horror Writers Association is a worldwide organization promoting dark literature and its creators. It has over 700 members who write, edit and publish professionally in fiction, nonfiction, videogames, films, comics, and other media.

Past winners
Past award winners include:
 (1997) Lawrence Watt-Evans and Robert Weinberg
 (1998) Sheldon Jaffery
 (2001) Nancy Etchemendy
 (2001) Nancy Etchemendy
 (2003) Douglas E. Winter
 (2004) Robert Weinberg (second award)
 (2005) Stephen Dorato
 (2006) Donna K. Fitch
 (2008) Sephera Giron
 (2009) Kathryn Ptacek
 (2010) Angel Leigh McCoy
 (2011) Guy Anthony De Marco
 (2012) Charles Day
 (2013) Norman Rubenstein
 (2014) Rena Mason
 (2015) Michael Knost
 (2016) James Chambers
 (2018) Jess Landry
 (2019) Leslie S. Klinger
 (2020) Carina Bissett, Brian W. Matthews

See also
 Horror Writers Association
 Bram Stoker Award

References

External links 
Official website

American literary awards